The National Living Treasures Award, alternatively known as the Gawad sa Manlilikha ng Bayan (GAMABA), is conferred to a person or group of artists recognized by the Government of the Philippines for their contributions to the country's intangible cultural heritage. A recipient of the award, a National Living Treasure or Manlilikha ng Bayan  is "a Filipino citizen or group of Filipino citizens engaged in any traditional art uniquely Filipino, whose distinctive skills have reached such a high level of technical and artistic excellence and have been passed on to and widely practiced by the present generations in their community with the same degree of technical and artistic competence."

History 
In 1988, the National Folk Artists Award was organized by the Rotary Club of Makati-Ayala. The distinctions were given by the organization until it was replaced by the GAMABA Law in 1992. The recipients of the National Folk Artists from 1988-1992 are not recognized by the government as the award was given by a private organization.

The National Living Treasures Award (Gawad sa Manlilikha ng Bayan) was institutionalized in 1992 through Republic Act No. 7355. The National Commission for Culture and the Arts, which is the highest policy-making and coordinating body of the Philippines for culture and the arts, was tasked with the implementation and awarding. This is in line with UNESCO's criteria of Living National Treasures.

Criteria 
To become a National Living Treasure, the candidate must possess the following qualifications:

is an inhabitant of an indigenous/traditional cultural community anywhere in the Philippines that has preserved indigenous customs, beliefs, rituals and traditions and/or has syncretized whatever external elements that have influenced it.
must have engaged in a folk art tradition that has been in existence and documented for at least 50 years.
must have consistently performed or produced over a significant period, works of superior and distinctive quality.
must possess a mastery of tools and materials needed by the art, and must have an established reputation in the art as master and maker of works of extraordinary technical quality.
must have passed on and/or will pass on to other members of the community their skills in the folk art for which the community is traditionally known.

A traditional artist who possesses all the qualities of a Manlilikha ng Bayan candidate, but due to age or infirmity has left them incapable of teaching further their craft, may still be recognized if:

had created a significant body of works and/or has consistently displayed excellence in the practice of their art, thus achieving important contributions for its development.
has been instrumental in the revitalization of their community's artistic tradition.
has passed on to the other members of the community skills in the folk art for which the community is traditionally known.
community has recognized them as master and teacher of their craft.

Categories 

The categories are, but not limited to, the following categories of traditional folk arts:

 ethnomedicine
 folk architecture
 maritime transport
 weaving
 carving
 performing arts
 literature
 graphic and plastic arts
 ornament
 textile or fiber arts
 pottery.

Other artistic expressions of traditional culture may be added, such as the case of the ethnomedicine category, which was added only in 2020.

Recipients 
As defined by UNESCO, the bearers of intangible cultural heritage are to be known internationally as Living Human Treasures. The Filipino counterparts of this title are the Gawad sa Manlilikha ng Bayan (GAMABA) awardees. There are currently sixteen declared GAMABA awardees, all of which have exemplified the highest standard in their respective field of expertise.

Recipients 
 Ginaw Bilog (d. 2003), artist and poet, Mansalay, Oriental Mindoro Poetry (Ambahan), December 17, 1993
 Masino Intaray (d. 2013), musician and epic chanter, Brooke's Point, Palawan, Poetry (Kulilal and Bagit) and Music (Basal / Gong), 1993
 Samaon Sulaiman (d. 2011), musician, Mamasapano, Maguindanao Music (Kutyapi), 1993
 Lang Dulay, (d. 2015) textile weaver, Lake Sebu, South Cotabato, Weaving (T’nalak), 1998
 Salinta Monon (d. 2009), weaver, Bansalan, Davao del Sur, Weaving (Abaca – ikat / Inabal), 1998
 Alonzo Saclag, musician and dancer, Lubuagan, Kalinga, Music and Dance (Kalinga), 2000
 Federico Caballero, epic chanter, Sulod- Bukidnon, Iloilo, Poetry and Epic Chant (Sugidanon), 2000
 Uwang Ahadas, musician, Lamitan, Basilan, Music (Yakan specifically Kulintang, kwitangan kayu, gabbang, agung, and tuntungan), 2000
 Darhata Sawabi, (d. 2005), weaver, Parang, Sulu, Weaving (Pis Syabit), 2004
 Eduardo Mutuc, metalsmith / metal sculptor, Apalit, Pampanga, Metalwork (Bronze and Silver), 2004
 Haja Amina Appi (d. 2013), weaver, Tandubas, Tawi-Tawi, Weaving (Mat), 2004
 Teofilo Garcia, casque maker, San Quintin, Abra, Casque Making (Tabungaw), 2012
 Magdalena Gamayo, master weaver, Pinili, Ilocos Norte, Weaving (Inabel), 2012
 Ambalang Ausalin (d. 2022), master weaver, Lamitan, Basilan, Weaving (Yakan tennun), 2016
 Estelita Tumandan Bantilan, master weaver, Malapatan, Sarangani, Weaving (B'laan igem), 2016
 Yabing Masalon Dulo (d. 2021), master weaver, Polomolok, South Cotabato, Weaving (Ikat), 2016

See also 
National Artist of the Philippines
Art in the Philippines
Tourism in the Philippines
Living Human Treasure

References 

Arts in the Philippines
 
Orders, decorations, and medals of the Philippines